On September 13, 1919, a fire and explosion occurred at the Standard Oil Company in Greenpoint, Brooklyn, New York City.

Fire
A fire broke in Tank No. 36 on the Standard Oil Company Campus around 2:00 p.m., but before the New York City Fire Department was called, the tank ignited, sparking off multiple fires throughout the campus. The yard held large quantities of naphtha, gasoline, oil and alcohol and more 1000 barrels of other explosive and flammable liquids. The fire burned furiously for three days, destroying millions of gallons of oil and caused damage estimated at $5,000,000 ($ in ). Over 1,000 firemen fought the spectacular blaze, 300 of which were treated for burns and minor injuries.

Standard Oil’s Brooklyn refinery may have been an intentional attempt to clear the land and draw insurance.  The fire site is now the location of the Bayside Fuel Oil depot at Bushwick Inlet.

See also

Great Fire of New York

References 
Notes

Bibliography 

 - Total pages: 272 

Standard Oil Company fire
Standard Oil Company fire
Standard Oil Company fire
Standard Oil Company fire
1910s in Brooklyn
Building and structure fires in New York City  
Industrial fires
Industrial fires and explosions in the United States 
Standard Oil Company fire 
Fires in New York City
Greenpoint, Brooklyn